Ralph Augustus Goullet (25 January 1904 – 24 December 1993) was an Australian rules footballer who played for Hawthorn in the Victorian Football League (VFL).

Goullet played in the seconds at Richmond but after not being able to break into the seniors crossed over to Hawthorn. The club, in just its fourth VFL season, struggled on the field and Goullet was in the losing team in each of his 14 games. He had much more success at Northcote, where he played in premierships, including one as captain-coach in 1934. Brighton secured his services as playing coach in 1936.

References

1904 births
Hawthorn Football Club players
Northcote Football Club players
Northcote Football Club coaches
Brighton Football Club players
Brighton Football Club coaches
Australian rules footballers from Victoria (Australia)
1993 deaths